St Andrew's Anglican church, Roseville is an active Anglican church on the corner of Bancroft Avenue and Hill Street in Roseville, New South Wales, Australia.  It is part of the Diocese of Sydney.  The first church building was licensed for use on 2 April 1913. The foundation stone for the current building was laid by Archbishop Howard Mowll in 1935.  The rector of the time was W. J. Roberts.  The building was designed by C. H. Finch, and built by S. C. Molineaux, and seats around 350.  The original cost of the building was about �5500.

The main level of the church consists of the nave, transepts, chancel, baptistry, organ chamber, porches, and a tower on the north west corner. The gradient of the land was utilised to allow for a lower level of vestries, offices, a kitchenette and bathroom.  Originally one of these rooms was used as a kindergarten classroom.  The walls are entirely of red brick, resting on a sandstone base.  The windows are leaded.

See also 

 Australian non-residential architectural styles
 List of Anglican churches in the Diocese of Sydney

References

External links 
 St Andrew's home page

1935 establishments in Australia
Anglican church buildings in Sydney
Anglican Diocese of Sydney
20th-century Anglican church buildings
Churches completed in 1935
Roseville, New South Wales
20th-century churches in Australia